Griveaudyria mascarena is a tussock moth from Madagascar, first described by Arthur Gardiner Butler in 1878.

References

Lymantriinae
Moths described in 1878